Saint-Geniez-d'Olt (literally Saint Geniez of Olt) is a former commune in the Aveyron department in southern France. On 1 January 2016, it was merged into the new commune of Saint-Geniez-d'Olt-et-d'Aubrac. The theologian and encyclopédiste Jean Pestré (1723–1821) was born in the village.

Population

Its inhabitants are called Marmots.

See also
Communes of the Aveyron department
List of medieval bridges in France

References

External links

 Marmotel camping

Former communes of Aveyron
Aveyron communes articles needing translation from French Wikipedia
Populated places disestablished in 2016